Two motions of no confidence in the French government of Élisabeth Borne were tabled on 17 March 2023. One motion was proposed by a cross-party alliance that included the left-wing NUPES and the regionalist LIOT, and the other by the right-wing populist National Rally. This was in response to the government's use of Article 49.3 to pass a controversial law that raised the retirement age from 62 to 64. On March 20, both motions were voted down. The cross-party motion failed by a margin of only 9 votes.

The National Rally voted in favor of both motions, while the majority of Republicans didn't vote for either one.

Text of motions

Cross-party motion

National Rally motion

Results

Cross-party motion of no confidence

Motion of no confidence by RN

Notes

References

2023 in French politics
2023 in Paris
March 2023 events in France
Votes of no confidence in France
Emmanuel Macron